Herzl Berger (‎; 31 July 1904 – 28 August 1962) was a Minsk-born Israeli activist and politician. He served as a member of the Knesset for Mapai between 1951 and 1962.

Biography
Born in Minsk in the Russian Empire (today in Belarus), Berger attended the Reali High School in his home city. Between 1917 and 1921, he was a member of the Zionist Hashomer Hatzair and HaHaver youth movements, which had been banned by the Soviet authorities. In 1921 he moved to Berlin, where he joined the Right section of Poale Zion, serving as secretary of its central committee between 1930 and 1931. He also studied at the University of Jena and gained a doctorate in law and political science.

In 1932, he moved to Poland, and between 1933 and 1934, was a member of the Poale Zion Socialist Zionists' central committee. He also worked on the editorial board of the Das Vert newspaper.

In 1934, he made aliyah to Mandatory Palestine, where he worked for the Davar newspaper. He also joined the Haganah, and was a political commentator for Kol Yisrael.

In the 1949 elections he was given a place on the Mapai list, but the party did not win enough seats for him to make it into the Knesset. However, he entered the parliament on 5 February 1951 as a replacement for Yehudit Simhonit, who had resigned her seat. He retained his seat in the July 1951 elections, and was re-elected in 1955, 1959 and 1961. He died in 1962 whilst still a Knesset member, and was replaced by Gideon Ben-Yisrael.

References

External links
 

1904 births
1962 deaths
Politicians from Minsk
Belarusian Jews
University of Jena alumni
Israeli journalists
Haganah members
Soviet emigrants to Germany
Polish emigrants to Mandatory Palestine
Mapai politicians
Members of the 1st Knesset (1949–1951)
Members of the 2nd Knesset (1951–1955)
Members of the 3rd Knesset (1955–1959)
Members of the 4th Knesset (1959–1961)
Members of the 5th Knesset (1961–1965)
Burials at Nahalat Yitzhak Cemetery
20th-century journalists